Finksburg is an unincorporated community in Carroll County, Maryland, United States. It is the location of the National Security Agency's EKMS Central Facility. Finksburg is located at the intersection of Maryland Routes 91 and 140, on the border of Carroll and Baltimore counties. It is an unincorporated area approximately one mile northwest of the Liberty Reservoir and six miles southeast of Westminster. It is also mentioned in Season 3 Episode 8 of mayday.

Finksburg is named after Adam Fink, owner of a local tavern and toll road in the early 19th century.

Modern day 
The Finksburg community is protected by the Reese & Community Volunteer Fire Company.

The area is served by Sandymount Elementary, Shiloh Middle, and Westminster High Schools. Gerstell Academy, an independent K-12 school is also located in Finksburg. Across the street sits the 13,805 sq. ft. Finksburg Branch of the Carroll County Public Library which opened in 2009 and "was the first green building in Carroll County" 

Finksburg is host to the Roaring Run Community Park, a small sports complex with four baseball diamonds, as well as Sandymount Park which features walking paths, tennis courts, a basketball court, playground, three baseball diamonds, and six grass athletic fields. 
The Greater Baltimore Hindu-Jain Temple and the Evergreen Memorial Gardens cemetery are located in Finksburg.

Car 54, Where Are You? and Munsters actor Fred Gwynne is interred at the Sandy Mount United Methodist Church's cemetery in an unmarked grave. Finksburg was referenced in Season 5, Episode 9 of the television comedy Brooklyn Nine-Nine.

Yearly, the Baltimore Ravens training camp hosts practice in Owings Mills, several miles away. Former Ravens players Torrey Smith and Haloti Ngata lived locally.

Transportation
The Owings Mills station of the Baltimore Metro SubwayLink in nearby Owings Mills, Baltimore County, is a 15-minute drive by car from Finksburg and provides subway access to downtown Baltimore.

History 
 1849 – Edward Remington and the Patapsco Mining Company opened cobalt mines near Finksburg 
 1855 – Western Maryland Railroad reached Finksburg
 1856 – A. L. Hoover was postmaster of Finksburg, earning $63.60 for the year
 1858 – Cobalt mining was unprofitable and mines were closed for financial reasons
 1866 – Baseball was the most popular sport, the "Star" of Finksburg was the local club (team) 
 1873 – The Alpha Farmers' Club of Carroll County was established 
 1881 – The Finksburg Literary Society organized lecturers for Friday night meetings at the Mechanics' Hall.  Admission was 5 cents.
 1888 – L. A. J. Lamotte operated a business for canning corn 
 1935 – Sandymount Elementary School began as a three-room stone building consolidating the smaller one room schools of Reese, Bethel, and Sandymount.
2002 – Independent K-12 school Gerstell Academy opens

Timeline information generally taken from:
Warner, Nancy, Ralph Levering and Margaret Taylor Woltz. Carroll County Maryland: A History 1837–1976. Carroll County Bicentennial Committee, 1976.

Cold Saturday was listed on the National Register of Historic Places in 2008.  The Taylor-Manning-Leppo House was listed in 2009.

References

External links 

Finksburg Today – Finksburg, MD daily news headlines, weather, more. 

Unincorporated communities in Carroll County, Maryland
Unincorporated communities in Maryland